Dick Tärnström (born January 20, 1975) is a Swedish retired professional ice hockey defenceman. During the majority of  his 21-year-long playing career, Tärnström played for AIK of the Swedish top-tier league Elitserien (SEL). He was the captain for AIK during the five last seasons of his career. He also spent five years in the National Hockey League (NHL), playing for the New York Islanders, Pittsburgh Penguins, Edmonton Oilers, and Columbus Blue Jackets.

In January 2013, while playing for AIK, Tärnström was forced to retire due to a spinal disc herniation injury.

Playing career
Tärnström started his professional career in AIK of the Swedish top-tier league Elitserien (SEL). He was drafted as 272nd overall, in the eleventh round by the New York Islanders in the 1994 NHL Entry Draft.

During the 2003–04 season, he became the first defenceman in the history of the Pittsburgh Penguins to lead the team in scoring for an entire season, compiling 52 points in 80 games.  The Penguins acquired Ric Jackman at the trade deadline, and the two flourished together, combining for the "Ric and Dick show" on the powerplay. Through a 2010 Pittsburgh Post-Gazette series of Penguins "Teams of the Decades" Tärnström was named to the Penguins team of the '00s. He is still the only defenceman ever to lead the Penguins in scoring for a season.

During the lockout-season, 2004–05, Tärnström played in Södertälje SK in Sweden.

Tärnström requested a trade from the Pittsburgh Penguins and on January 26, 2006, he went to the Edmonton Oilers in exchange for Cory Cross and Jani Rita.

Tärnström was part of the Cinderella Edmonton Oilers team that made a run to the Stanley Cup Finals. However, the Oilers lost in game 7 of the finals to the Carolina Hurricanes. Tärnström had 0 goals and 2 assists in the 2006 Playoffs.

During the 2006–07 season, Tärnström played with HC Lugano of the Nationalliga A.

Tärnström returned to the NHL by signing a contract with the Oilers on July 1, 2007. He was traded on February 1, 2008 to the Columbus Blue Jackets in exchange for Curtis Glencross.

In the 2008–09 season, Tärnström returned to play for AIK of the Swedish second-tier league HockeyAllsvenskan (Swe-2). He was appointed the team's captain. The plan was to help AIK promote back to the top-tier league Elitserien (SEL) due to AIK's financial problems at that time. AIK were promoted to the SEL in the 2009–10 season, and Tärnström would remain in the team until he was forced to retire in January 2013 due to a spinal disc herniation injury.

Personal life
Tärnström's son Oliver Tärnström  is an ice hockey centre playing for Rögle BK J20 of the J20 Nationell.  Oliver was drafted by the New York Rangers in the 2020 NHL Entry Draft in the 3rd round with the 92nd overall draft pick.

Career statistics

Regular season and playoffs

International

References

External links
 
 Dick Tärnström at nhpla.com

1975 births
Living people
AIK IF players
Bridgeport Sound Tigers players
Columbus Blue Jackets players
Edmonton Oilers players
HC Lugano players
New York Islanders draft picks
New York Islanders players
People from Sundbyberg Municipality
Pittsburgh Penguins players
Södertälje SK players
Swedish ice hockey defencemen
Sportspeople from Stockholm County
Swedish expatriate ice hockey players in the United States
Swedish expatriate ice hockey players in Canada
Swedish expatriate sportspeople in Switzerland
Expatriate ice hockey players in Switzerland